Karen Kunc (b. 1952 Omaha, Nebraska) is an American book artist and printmaker known for her woodblock prints. She attended the University of Nebraska-Lincoln and Ohio State University. She has taught at the University of Nebraska-Lincoln since 1983. She is the 2007 recipient of the Southern Graphics Council's Printmaker Emeritus Award. In 2023 the Bainbridge Island Museum of Art held a solo exhibition of her work.

Kahn's work is in the Art Institute of Chicago, the Madison Museum of Contemporary Art, the National Museum of Women in the Arts the Smithsonian American Art Museum, and the Walker Art Center.

References

1952 births
Living people
Artists from Omaha, Nebraska
American women printmakers
Women book artists
Book artists
20th-century American women artists
20th-century American printmakers
21st-century American women artists
21st-century American printmakers
University of Nebraska–Lincoln alumni
Ohio State University alumni